Nanling County is a county in the southeast of Anhui Province, China. It is under the administration of Wuhu City.

Administrative divisions
Nanling County is divided to 9 towns.
9 Towns

Climate

References

Wuhu